William Edmund Barrett (November 16, 1900 – September 14, 1986) was an American writer, best known for the 1962 novella The Lilies of the Field.

Life
Barrett was born in New York City November 16, 1900, to John Joseph and Eleanor Margaret (Flannery) Barrett. His family was Roman Catholic. In 1916, he and his family moved to Denver, Colorado. He returned east to attend Manhattan College, from which he was graduated in 1922.

Barrett spent most of his life in Denver. From 1923-1929 he worked as the Rocky Mountain advertising manager for Westinghouse. He married Christine M. Rollman on February 15, 1925.

Deeply interested in aviation, he was a civilian lecturer for the United States Air Force, and worked as an aeronautics consultant with the Denver Public Library from 1941 on. He received a citation from Regis College in 1956.

Writing
In a writing career that spanned over 50 years, Barrett's works include short stories, biographies, novels, reviews and non-fiction. In 1929, he began writing freelance for pulp magazines. His first novel, Woman on Horseback was published in 1938. In 1964, he wrote  Shepherd of Mankind, a biography of Pope Paul VI.

He was a member of PEN and the Authors League of America. In 1961 he received an Honorary Doctor of Literature degree from Creighton University. He was a member of the National Press Club of Washington, D.C. and the Colorado Authors League, serving as its president from 1943–1944.

Three of his novels were made into films: 
The Left Hand of God, starring Humphrey Bogart
Lilies of the Field based on his novel The Lilies of the Field, featuring Sidney Poitier
Pieces of Dreams, based on The Wine and the Music.

Barrett had been in poor health after suffering a heart attack and died in his sleep in Denver September 14, 1986 at the age of eighty-five.

Bibliography

Woman on Horseback (1938)
Flight from Youth (1939)
Aviation as a Business (1945)
The Evil Heart (1946)
The Number of My Days (1946)
To the Last Man (1948)
The Left Hand of God (1951)
Shadows of the Images (1953)
The Sudden Strangers (1956)
The Empty Shrine (1958)
The First War Planes (1960)
The Edge of Things (1960)
The Lilies of the Field (1962)
The Fools of Time (1963)
The Shepherd of Mankind (1964)
The Glory Tent (1967)
The Red Lacquered Gate (1967)
The Wine and the Music (also under the title Pieces of Dreams) (1968)
A Woman in the House (1971)
The Shape of Illusion (1972)
Lady of the Lotus (1975)

See also
 List of Manhattan College people

References

External links

William E. Barrett Papers, 1926–1975 (Finding Aid), University of Denver

1900 births
1986 deaths
American male novelists
Manhattan College alumni
20th-century American novelists
20th-century American male writers
Writers from New York City
Novelists from New York (state)
Catholics from New York (state)
Writers from Denver
Novelists from Colorado
Catholics from Colorado